The WCWA World Heavyweight Championship was a professional wrestling world heavyweight championship promoted by the Dallas–Fort Worth metroplex area–based World Class Wrestling Association (WCWA). The championship was originally created in June 1966 by WCWA's predecessor NWA Big Time Wrestling (BTW), billed as the local version of the NWA United States Heavyweight Championship before being renamed the NWA American Heavyweight Championship in May 1968. In 1982, Big Time Wrestling rebranded themselves as "World Class Championship Wrestling" (WCCW) and the championship was renamed the WCCW American Heavyweight Championship. In 1986 WCCW withdrew from the National Wrestling Alliance, creating the World Class Wrestling Association, replacing the WCCW American Heavyweight Championship with the WCWA Heavyweight Championship, replacing the NWA Worlds Heavyweight Championship as the top title recognized by the promotion. In 1989, the WCWA championship was unified with the AWA World Heavyweight Championship to become the USWA Unified World Heavyweight Championship as WCWA merged with the Continental Wrestling Association (CWA) to become the United States Wrestling Association. In 1990 WCWA split from the USWA, but the promotion folded without determining a WCWA World Heavyweight Champion. As it is a professional wrestling championship, the WCWA World Heavyweight Championship was not won by actual competition, but by a scripted ending to a match.

The first recognized Texas based NWA United States Champion was Fritz Von Erich, introducing the championship to his Southwest Sports promotion as the top championship in his territory. Fritz Von Erich would go on to win the championship a record setting 20 times. At the time it was not unusual for the promoter, if he was also an active wrestler, to hold the championship multiple times, being that he would always be available to work shows and face off against various "outsiders". Fritz' last reign was on June 4, 1982  16 years after his first title victory. Rick Rude was the last WCCW American Heavyweight Champion and announced as the first WCWA World Heavyweight Champion on February 21, 1986. Jerry Lawler was the final champion, winning it on April 14, 1989, followed by the announcement that the championship had been unified with the AWA World Heavyweight Champion in September 1990. The longest confirmed reign, Fritz Von Erich's fifth reign over all, lasted from March 27, 1967 to April 5, 1968 for a total of 375 days. Von Erich's final reign was also the shortest in history, as he vacated moments after winning it in the main event of the Fritz Von Erich Retirement Show. With his last title victory Fritz became the oldest champion, at 52 years of age. Fritz's second-youngest son, Mike Von Erich, was the youngest champion at just (20 years, 5 months, 2 days).

Title history

See also
 National Wrestling Alliance
 United States Wrestling Association
 World Class Championship Wrestling

Explanatory notes

References

General references

Citations 

Continental professional wrestling championships
Heavyweight wrestling championships
National professional wrestling championships
National Wrestling Alliance championships
United States professional wrestling championships
World Class Championship Wrestling championships
World heavyweight wrestling championships